WXTQ (105.5 FM) is a radio station broadcasting a hot adult contemporary format. Licensed to serve Athens, Ohio, United States, the station is owned by WATH, Inc.

References

External links

XTQ
Hot adult contemporary radio stations in the United States
Radio stations established in 1964
1964 establishments in Ohio